Dilmurod Akramzhanovich Satybaldiev (born 2 June 1994) is a Russian professional boxer who turned pro in 2013.

Professional boxing record

References

1994 births
Living people
Russian male boxers
Super-middleweight boxers